Nymphon leptocheles is a species of sea spider first described by Georg Ossian Sars in 1888. The species greatly resembles other members of the genus Nymphon, and species identification from morphological traits alone is therefore a complex task.

Habitat
The species inhabits the sublittoral zone and occurs amongst hydroids and sea anemones.

Diet
N. leptocheles feeds on coelenterates.

References

Pycnogonids
Taxa named by Georg Ossian Sars
Animals described in 1888